El Hombre Redimido (English: Man redeemed) is a bronze statue by Victor Cott that commemorates the abolition of slavery in Puerto Rico. It is located on Avenida Hostos at the fork of Calle Salud and Calle Marina streets, in Barrio Cuarto, Ponce, Puerto Rico.

Background

Slaves were brought to Puerto Rico from Africa starting in 1513 and through the 18th century to replace the local native "Indian" slaves who had been decimated. The new slaves worked the coffee, sugar cane, and gold mining industries in Puerto Rico. During the 18th century, as gold mining ceased to be one of the major industries in Puerto Rico, slaves worked mostly in coffee plantations and sugar cane fields.  By Royal proclamation slavery was abolished on 22 March 1873.

In 1874, a group of citizens built a small park in Ponce in memory of the historic event.  In 1880 Olimpio Otero, Juan Mayoral Barnés, and Román Baldorioty de Castro were instrumental in creating the concept for a park dedicated to the commemorating the abolition of slavery, the only such memorial in the Caribbean. Juan Mayoral Barnés brought the idea for the creation of the park to the Ponce Municipal Assembly on 14 March 1880. It was unanimously approved by the Assembly, ratified by the Central Government, and confirmed by Royal Decree on 1 March 1881.

In 1956, under the administration of Ponce mayor Andrés Grillasca Salas, the park was renovated and enlarged to include an obelisk and the statue.

Description
Built in 1956 to be part of the renovation and enlargement of the park that had stood there since the 1890s, El Hombre Redimido was designed by Victor M. Cott (b. 1898, Collores, Juana Díaz, Puerto Rico) and is forged in bronze.  Victor Cott himself modeled for the statue on its knees and the bronze statue was subsequently forged in the United States. It is approximately four feet high. It was restored in 2006.

See also

 Afro-Puerto Ricans

References

1956 sculptures
Sculptures of men
Statues in Ponce, Puerto Rico
1956 establishments in Puerto Rico
Buildings and structures in Ponce, Puerto Rico
Sculptures of men in Puerto Rico
Public art in Puerto Rico
Monuments and memorials in Ponce, Puerto Rico
Slavery memorials
Cultural depictions of Puerto Rican people